Han Xue (born 11 January 1983), also known as Cecilia Han, is a Chinese singer and actress of Miao ethnicity.

Han is noted for her roles as Baigujing and Diaochan in the television series Journey to the West and Cao Cao respectively.

Early life and education
Han was born in a military family in Suzhou, Jiangsu, her grandfather Han Shu was a general of the People's Liberation Army, he participated in the Second Sino-Japanese War and Korean War. Her grandmother was once the leading lady in the Chinese People's Liberation Army Naval Song and Dance Troupe, her aunt Han Mei is a noted musician in Canada. At the age of 6, Han studied singing with the Suzhou City Choir. Her secondary education was at Suzhou No.1 Middle School. Han graduated from Shanghai Theatre Academy.

Career
During her university period, Han began working on her debut solo album under Sony Music Entertainment. The album's lead single, "Falling Snow", was released on 15 October 2004, it's a cover of Mika Nakashima. That same year, she starred with Aaron Kwok and Cecilia Cheung in Jingle Ma's Para Para Sakura.

In 2003, Han starred in the wuxia television series Flying Daggers, adapted from Gu Long's novel Feidao Youjian Feidao of the Xiaoli Feidao Series.

In 2004, Han starred as Zhantai Mingjing in the wuxia television series Heroic Legend, based on the novel by the same name by Liang Yusheng. That same year, she also starred in the horror film Don't Enter the Deserted House, and comedy drama series Good Luck Zhu Bajie as Princess Iron Fan.

Her 2nd album, titled Summer Love, was released on 27 March 2006. The same year, she was cast in The Little Fairy, a historical romance television series starring Hu Ge and Ariel Lin, she received positive reviews.

Her 3rd album, titled A Journey Into Fantasy, was released on 31 October 2007. Forbes China Celebrity 100 named Han on their list of the 100 Chinese celebrities. The same year, she played the lead role in Strange Stories from a Chinese Studio 2, a television series adaptation based on the novel of the same name by Pu Songling.  She also starred as the female lead in the period romance drama A Love Before Gone With Wind.

In 2008, Han sang the song Beijing, Beijing, I Love Beijing with Rain, Kelly Chen, Tan Jing, and Aaron Kwok for the 2008 Beijing Olympic Games. Then she starred in the romance drama A Mobile Love Story alongside Wallace Huo.

Her 5th album, titled My Song for You, was released on 18 May 2009 by Universal Music Group.

On 30 June 2010, Huayi Brothers released her 6th album Flower in Heart. The same year, she became well known for her role as Baigujing in hit TV drama Journey to the West, the series reached number one in the ratings when it aired in China.

Her 7th album, titled They Said, was released 15 August 2012 by Gold Typhoon.

In 2013, Han starred in the historical television series Cao Cao directed by Hu Mei, playing the role of Diaochan. The same year, she starred in the biographical series Ip Man, portraying Ip Man's love interest.

In 2015, Han starred in the historical film Cairo Declaration. The same year, she appeared in the shenmo television series Strange Stories from a Chinese Studio 4	.

In 2016, Han starred as the lead in the horror film The Golden Doll.

In 2017, Han starred in the fantasy drama Lost Love in Times.

In 2019, Han was cast in the political drama People's Justice as a prosecutor, the sequel to the hit drama In the Name of the People.

Filmography

Film

Television series

Discography

Studio album

Music Video

Awards

References

External links

 
 

1983 births
21st-century Chinese actresses
Actresses from Suzhou
Living people
Actresses from Jiangsu
Singers from Suzhou
Shanghai Theatre Academy alumni
Chinese Mandopop singers
Chinese film actresses
Chinese television actresses
21st-century Chinese women singers